Västerbotten County or Region Västerbotten held a regional council election on 9 September 2018, on the same day as the general and municipal elections.

Results
The number of seats remained at 71 with the Social Democrats winning the most at 26, a drop of four from 2014.

Municipalities

Images

References

Elections in Västerbotten County
Västerbotten